USS Merapi (AF-38) was an Adria stores ship acquired by the U.S. Navy for service in World War II, named after Mount Merapi, the mountain in Java, Indonesia. Her task was to carry stores, refrigerated items, and equipment to ships in the fleet, and to remote stations and staging areas.

Merapi was laid down 11 August 1944 by Pennsylvania Shipyards Inc., Beaumont, Texas, under a Maritime contract; launched 4 October 1944; sponsored by Mrs. A. B. Matthews; transferred to the Navy 5 March and commissioned 21 March 1945.

World War II service 

Converted at Todd Galveston Dry Dock Co., Merapi hastened through shakedown and departed Mobile, Alabama, 11 April, for the Pacific Ocean war zone. Specializing in refrigerated stores, she sailed via Pearl Harbor to Kerama Retto, Okinawa where in the midst of numerous air alerts she unloaded 14 to 19 June. Having retired to Pearl Harbor for more supplies she got underway again on 20 July and spent the final month of the war at Eniwetok Atoll disbursing cargo.

Post-war activity 

In the postwar period Merapi provided logistic support for U.S. occupation forces, initially using Auckland, New Zealand, as her supply base. Spending much of 1946 and part of 1948 on the China coast she remained active through the central and western Pacific until 1950.

Korean War operations 

During the Korean War she operated with units of the U.S. 7th Fleet in Korean and Japanese waters. While employed as a support vessel, she saw action off the Pusan Perimeter, participated in the Wonsan and Inchon invasions, and assisted in the evacuation of troops from Hungnam.

Vietnam operations 

A return to the United States in the latter half of 1953 preceded assignment to the mid Pacific logistic support group home ported at Pearl Harbor. Support of facilities at Kwajalein, Marshalls, Eniwetok, Carolines, and Midway Island was temporarily interrupted in September 1954. For 3 months Merapi provided food stocks to the ships engaged in the evacuation of civilians and troops from North Vietnam to Saigon in Operation Passage to Freedom.

Supporting nuclear testing activity 

Interruptions also occurred March to July 1956 as AF-38 appeared in support of the nuclear testing exercise Operation Redwing, and the following April as she sailed on a good will visit to Australia. She then participated in Operation Hardtack I in the Marshall Islands.

The ship departed 5 August 1958 for a brief two-month WestPac tour before steaming back to the United States for her first appearance in over four years.

Inactivation and decommissioning 

Arriving in Astoria, Oregon on 6 November, inactivation began almost immediately. She was decommissioned 16 January 1959, joining the Pacific Reserve Fleet, until struck from the Navy List 1 July 1960. She was then sold by the Maritime Administration in 1966, and converted to a fish factory ship and renamed Northern Venture.

Military awards and honors 

Merapi received one battle star for World War II service, five for the Korean War, and was twice awarded the Korean Presidential Unit Citation. Her crew was eligible for the following medals shown in order of precedence:
 China Service Medal (extended)
 American Campaign Medal
 Asiatic-Pacific Campaign Medal (1)
 World War II Victory Medal
 Navy Occupation Service Medal (with Asia clasp)
 National Defense Service Medal
 Korean Service Medal (5)
 Republic of Korea Presidential Unit Citation (2)
 United Nations Service Medal
 Republic of Korea War Service Medal (retroactive)

References

External links 
 

Adria-class stores ships
World War II auxiliary ships of the United States
Cold War auxiliary ships of the United States
Korean War auxiliary ships of the United States
Ships built in Beaumont, Texas
1944 ships